André Niklaus (born 30 August 1981 in Berlin) is a German decathlete.

Achievements

References

External links

1981 births
Living people
German decathletes
Athletes from Berlin
Athletes (track and field) at the 2008 Summer Olympics
Olympic athletes of Germany
World Athletics Indoor Championships winners